Chenareh-ye Majid (also Romanized as Chenāreh-ye Majīd) is a village and commercial hub in Jeygaran Rural District, Ozgoleh District, Salas-e Babajani County, Kermanshah Province, Iran. At the 2006 census, its population was 224, in 32 families.

References 

Populated places in Salas-e Babajani County